Oedemera croceicollis is a species from the genus Oedemera. The species was originally described by Leonard Gyllenhaal in 1827.

References

Taxa named by Leonard Gyllenhaal
Oedemeridae